Welaun (also known as Bekais or Wekais) is an Austronesian language spoken on the border of East Timor and West Timor (a  part of Indonesia). It is closely related to Tetun.

Previous studies
Welaun was documented by Hull (2003) and Edwards (2019). Edwards (2019) estimates a speaker population of 5,575. A dictionary of Welaun has been written by da Silva (2012).

Phonology

It has five vowels:

References

Timor–Babar languages
Languages of East Timor
Languages of Indonesia
Maluku Islands